Karl Hoffmann may refer to:

Karl Hoffmann (architect) (1883–1951), German architect
Karl Hoffmann (politician) (1820–1895), declined election to the Swiss Federal Council in 1881
Karl Hoffmann (naturalist) (1823–1859), German physician and naturalist
Karl Hoffmann (linguist) (1915–1996), German linguist
Karl Hoffmann (rower) (born 1906), German Olympic rower
Karl Hoffmann (footballer) (1935–2020), German footballer
Karl W. Hofmann (born 1961), former United States Ambassador to Togo

See also
Carl Hoffman (born 1960), American travel and fiction writer
Carl Henry Hoffman (1896–1980), U.S. Representative from Pennsylvania
Carl Hoffmann (1885–1947), German cinematographer and film director
Karl-Heinz Hoffmann (disambiguation)